Kıvılcım Kaya Salman (born Kıvılcim Kaya on March 27, 1992 in Ankara) is a Turkish female hammer thrower.

She is the daughter of the former Turkish national wrestler Ziya Kaya. She began working with Artun Talay, who guided to Eşref Apak for Olympics bronze medal in Athens 2004. She made first big step to international scene at 2009 World Youth Championships in Brixen, after taking the silver medal in the girl's hammer throw competition. Then she broke national junior hammer record in Ankara with a 65.10 meter throw. She then took the silver medal at the 2011 European Junior Championships.

Kıvılcım threw 72.55 metres at the Turkish Championships.

At the 2013 Turkish championships, she tested positive for doping and was suspended between June 2013 and June 2015.

She competed at the 2012 Summer Olympics, the 2015 World Championships, the 2016 European Championships and the 2016 Summer Olympics without reaching the final.

References

1992 births
Living people
Turkish female hammer throwers
Sportspeople from Ankara
Olympic athletes of Turkey
Athletes (track and field) at the 2012 Summer Olympics
Athletes (track and field) at the 2016 Summer Olympics
World Athletics Championships athletes for Turkey
Doping cases in athletics
Turkish sportspeople in doping cases
Athletes (track and field) at the 2018 Mediterranean Games
Athletes (track and field) at the 2022 Mediterranean Games
Mediterranean Games silver medalists for Turkey
Mediterranean Games medalists in athletics
20th-century Turkish sportswomen
21st-century Turkish sportswomen
Islamic Solidarity Games medalists in athletics